The Region of Peel Secondary Schools Athletic Association or ROPSSAA is a high school league for 36 sports. It has 69 member schools throughout the Region of Peel from the Peel District School Board, the Dufferin-Peel Catholic District School Board, and 6 private schools. It is a member of the Ontario Federation of School Athletic Associations (OFSAA).

Sports included

Alpine Skiing
Archery
Association football
Badminton
Baseball
Basketball
Cricket
Cross Country
Curling
Fast Pitch Softball
Field Hockey
Football
Flag Football
Golf

Gymnastics
Ice hockey
Lacrosse
Nordic Skiing
Rugby union
slow-pitch softball
Special Event Track & Field
Swimming
Table Tennis
Tennis
Track and Field
Ultimate Frisbee
Volleyball
Wrestling

Member schools

Applewood Acres
Applewood Heights Secondary School
Applewood School
Ascension of Our Lord Secondary School
Bramalea Secondary School
Brampton Centennial Secondary School
Brampton Christian Academy
Cardinal Ambrozic Secondary School
Cardinal Leger Secondary School
Cawthra Park Secondary School
Central Peel Secondary School
Chinguacousy Secondary School
Clarkson Secondary School
David Suzuki Secondary School
Erindale Secondary School
Father Michael Goetz Secondary School
Fletcher's Meadow Secondary School
Glenforest Secondary School
Harold M. Brathwaite Secondary School
Heart Lake Secondary School
Holy Name of Mary Secondary School
The Humberview School
Iona Catholic Secondary School
École Jeunes sans Frontieres
John Cabot Catholic Secondary School
John Fraser Secondary School
Lincoln M. Alexander Secondary School
Lorne Park Secondary School
Louise Arbour Secondary School
Loyola Catholic Secondary School
Mayfield Secondary School
Meadowvale Secondary School
Mentor College
Mississauga Secondary School
North Park Secondary School
North Peel Secondary School
Notre Dame Catholic Secondary School
Our Lady of Mount Carmel Catholic Secondary School
Parkholme School
Philip Pocock Catholic Secondary School
Port Credit Secondary School
Rick Hansen Secondary School
Robert F. Hall Catholic Secondary School
St. Aloysius Gonzaga Secondary School
St. Augustine Catholic Secondary School
St. Edmund Campion Secondary School
St. Francis Xavier Secondary School
St. Joan of Arc Secondary School
St. Joseph's Secondary School
St. Marcellinius Secondary School
St. Marguerite d'Youville Secondary School
St. Martin Secondary School
St. Michael Catholic Secondary School
St. Paul Secondary School
St. Roch Secondary School
St. Thomas Aquinas Secondary School
Sainte Famille
Sandalwood Heights Secondary School
Stephen Lewis Secondary School
Streetsville Secondary School
T. L. Kennedy Secondary School
Turner Fenton Secondary School
West Credit Secondary School
The Woodlands School

External links
 www.ropssaa.org

Sport in Ontario
Education in the Regional Municipality of Peel